The Rap Olympics is a free-style rap event which was created and first begun in March 1993, in East Orange, New Jersey by Gregory Thomas of Nubian Recordings which consisted of a three state competition: PA, NJ and NY.

History
The original Rap Olympics showcase was held at club Zanzibar in Newark NJ in 1993. A different version was first held October 24, 1997, in Los Angeles near LAX airport. The winner of the event would receive $500 and a Rolex watch. In 1997, the rapper Otherwize  won, with Eminem coming in second place. Although Eminem lost the battle, an impressed Interscope Records intern in attendance called Dean Geistlinger asked Eminem for a copy of the Slim Shady EP, which was then sent to company CEO Jimmy Iovine who then played it for Dr. Dre, which ultimately resulted in him signing Eminem to Dre's record label, Aftermath.

The Rap Olympics were revived in 2007.

References

Music competitions in the United States
East Orange, New Jersey